Sarıyahşi is a town in Aksaray Province in the Central Anatolia region of Turkey, at a distance of  from the province seat of Aksaray. It is the seat of Sarıyahşi District. Its population is 3,543 (2021).

The town of Sarıyahşi is a small rural centre providing schools and other basic amenities to the surrounding countryside.

References

External links
 Gallery website 
 Municipality's official website 
 Local news website 
 Local news website 
 

Populated places in Aksaray Province
Towns in Turkey
Sarıyahşi District